Wut Tola (born 6 October 2002) is a Cambodian footballer who plays as a forward.

Career statistics

International

References

External links
 

2002 births
Living people
Cambodian footballers
Cambodia international footballers
Association football forwards
Prey Veng FC players
Visakha FC players
Cambodian Premier League players